The Asmara Synagogue is the only surviving remnant of the Jewish community in Eritrea. Built in 1906, includes a Jewish cemetery, classrooms, and a main sanctuary. All aspects of the synagogue today are taken care of by Samuel Cohen, an Asmara native who remained in the country to look after the edifice.

History
The synagogue was founded in 1906 by Yemenite Jewish immigrants from Aden. Along with the Adeni Jews, some congregants were Italian Jews. Others were refugees from Nazi Europe.

See also
History of the Jews in Eritrea

References

External links
Religious sites in Asmara

Adeni Jews
Buildings and structures in Asmara
Italian diaspora in Africa
Italian-Jewish diaspora
Orthodox Judaism in Africa
Orthodox synagogues
Synagogues completed in 1906
Synagogues in Eritrea
1906 establishments in Africa
1906 establishments in the Italian Empire
Yemeni-Jewish diaspora